Media is a village in Henderson County, Illinois, United States. The population was 107 at the 2010 census, down from 130 at the 2000 census. It is part of the Burlington, IA–IL Micropolitan Statistical Area.

Geography
Media is located in southeastern Henderson County at  (40.773075, -90.834690). Illinois Route 116 passes through the village, leading west and north  to U.S. Route 34 near Biggsville, and south and east  to Roseville.

Demographics

As of the census of 2000, there were 130 people, 56 households, and 39 families residing in the village. The racial makeup of the village was 97.69% White, 1.54% from other races, and 0.77% from two or more races. Hispanic or Latino of any race were 1.54% of the population.

There were 56 households, out of which 30.4% had children under the age of 18 living with them, 58.9% were married couples living together, 7.1% had a female householder with no husband present, and 28.6% were non-families. 23.2% of all households were made up of individuals, and 16.1% had someone living alone who was 65 years of age or older. The average household size was 2.32 and the average family size was 2.78.

In the village, the population was spread out, with 18.5% under the age of 18, 10.8% from 18 to 24, 25.4% from 25 to 44, 23.8% from 45 to 64, and 21.5% who were 65 years of age or older. The median age was 43 years. For every 100 females, there were 97.0 males. For every 100 females age 18 and over, there were 96.3 males.

The median income for a household in the village was $35,125, and the median income for a family was $36,500. Males had a median income of $30,625 versus $25,781 for females. The per capita income for the village was $20,149. There were 5.9% of families and 12.4% of the population living below the poverty line, including 29.4% of under eighteens and 9.1% of those over 64.

Origin of the village name

According to the common theory, the name of the village originated from the fact that the town is situated halfway between Chicago and Kansas City on the Santa Fe Railroad.

References

Villages in Henderson County, Illinois
Villages in Illinois
Burlington, Iowa micropolitan area